United Nations Security Council resolution 982, adopted unanimously on 31 March 1995, after reaffirming all resolutions on the situation in the former Yugoslavia in particular Resolution 947 (1994) concerning the United Nations Protection Force (UNPROFOR), the Council extended the mandate of UNPROFOR for additional period terminating 30 November 1995 and discussed operations in Croatia.

The government of Bosnia and Herzegovina had accepted the contact group peace plan and the parties in the country were observing a ceasefire agreement. The council was encouraged by UNPROFOR's efforts to assist in the implementation of the Washington agreements. The importance of the city of Sarajevo as the capital of Bosnia and Herzegovina and as a multicultural, multiethnic, and religious centre was reiterated, and that the agreement on demilitarisation of the city would have a positive effect. Human rights had to be respected in order to build mutual trust and peace.

The mandate of UNPROFOR was extended until 30 November 1995 and the Secretary-General Boutros Boutros-Ghali was authorised to redeploy all UNPROFOR personnel and assets from Croatia into Bosnia and Herzegovina, except those required for the United Nations Confidence Restoration Operation in Croatia. UNPROFOR would continue to carry out the implementation of relevant agreements, facilitate the delivery of humanitarian aid to Bosnia and Herzegovina via Croatia and maintain its support structure in that country. Meanwhile, parties in both countries were urged to observe the ceasefire and negotiate a peaceful settlement.

Finally, the resolution concluded by requesting the Secretary-General to keep the Council informed on developments in the region.

See also
 Bosnian War
 Breakup of Yugoslavia
 Croatian War of Independence
 List of United Nations Security Council Resolutions 901 to 1000 (1994–1995)
 Yugoslav Wars

References

External links
 
Text of the Resolution at undocs.org

 0982
 0982
1995 in Yugoslavia
1995 in Croatia
1995 in Bosnia and Herzegovina
 0982
March 1995 events